This is intended to be a complete list of New York State Historic Markers in Nassau County, New York.

Listings county-wide

Town of Hempstead

Town of North Hempstead

Town of Oyster Bay

City of Glen Cove

See also
List of New York State Historic Markers
National Register of Historic Places listings in New York
List of National Historic Landmarks in New York

References

External links
Nassau County, New York (Historical Marker Database)

Nassau County, New York
Nassau